This is a list of comic book sidekicks—defined as a character who spends a significant amount of time as a superhero's junior partner, or was officially acknowledged as the hero's sidekick for some period of time. (For the purposes of this list, it does not include animal companions like Krypto or Sandman's owls, or supervillain henchmen like The Joker's Harley Quinn.)

DC

Marvel Comics

Golden Age, independent, and non-U.S. titles

Newspaper comics

See also 
 Sidekick

References 

Lists of comics characters
Lists of fictional sidekicks